= Naulakla, Virginia =

Unincorporated community in Virginia, United States

Coordinates: 38°04′58″N 77°10′51″W

Naulakla is an unincorporated community in Caroline County, in the U.S. state of Virginia.
